The African-led International Support Mission to Mali (AFISMA) is an Economic Community of West African States (ECOWAS) organized military mission sent to support the government of ECOWAS member nation Mali against Islamist rebels in the Northern Mali conflict. The mission was authorized with UN Security Council Resolution 2085, passed on 20 December 2012, which "authorizes the deployment of an African-led International Support Mission in Mali (AFISMA) for an initial period of one year."

Initially, the mission was to begin in September 2013, but after an unexpected advance by the rebel forces in early January 2013 and the subsequent French intervention, ECOWAS decided to immediately deploy the AFISMA forces. On 17 January, Nigeria began deploying air and ground forces to Mali. The Nigerian deployment was followed by the arrival of a 160-man contingent from Burkina Faso the following week. The first commander of AFISMA is Nigerian Major General Abdulkadir Shehu.

Meanwhile, the heads of state and government of ECOWAS have endorsed Major General Shehu of Nigeria as Force Commander and Brigadier General Yaye Garba of Niger as Deputy Force Commander.

On January 31, the United States Department of State estimated that there were about 1,400 AFISMA troops from Nigeria, Benin, Togo, Senegal, Burkina Faso and Chad on the ground in Mali.

The following forces have been committed to AFISMA:

Casualties 

65 soldiers have been killed during the mission: 34 Chadians, 28 Nigerians, 2 Togolese and 1 Burkinabé.

See also
MINUSMA

References 

2013 in Mali
Economic Community of West African States
Peacekeeping missions and operations involving the African Union
Military operations involving Nigeria
Military operations involving South Africa
Mali War